Taman Dam  is a gravity dam located in Kagawa Prefecture in Japan. The dam is used for flood control. The catchment area of the dam is 5 km2. The dam impounds about 12  ha of land when full and can store 1600 thousand cubic meters of water. The construction of the dam was started on 1978 and completed in 1989.

See also
List of dams in Japan

References

Dams in Kagawa Prefecture